The Buccaneer 250 is an American trailerable sailboat, that was designed by Gary Mull and first built in 1978. The design is out of production.

Production
The boat was built by Buccaneer Yachts/US Yachts, a division of Bayliner, which is itself a division of the Brunswick Boat Group, which is in turn owned by the Brunswick Corporation.

The design was later developed into the US Yachts US 25 and the Triton 25.

Design
The Buccaneer 250 is a small recreational keelboat, built predominantly of fiberglass, with wood trim.

The Buccaneer 250 has a PHRF racing average handicap of 219 with a high of 216 and low of 225.

Variants
Buccaneer 250
Buccaneer 255

See also
List of sailing boat types

Similar sailboats
Catalina 250
Tanzer 25

References

Keelboats
1970s sailboat type designs
Sailing yachts
Trailer sailers
Sailboat type designs by Gary Mull
Sailboat types built by Buccaneer Yachts